Administrative divisions of Georgia may refer to:

 Administrative divisions of Georgia (country)
 Administrative divisions of Georgia (U.S. state)